is one of the central fictional characters of the Macross Japanese anime series. Her voice actress was Mika Doi in the original Japanese TV version, in Macross: Do You Remember Love? movie adaptation, and in The Super Dimension Fortress Macross: Flash Back 2012 OVA. Doi also played the character in a console video game based on the first film that was released for the Sega Saturn in 1997 to celebrate the 15th anniversary of the Macross franchise, and that was also ported to the PlayStation in 1999.

In the English dub of the original Japanese series that was released by ADV Films in January 2006 the character was voiced by Monica Rial.

In 1983, the character Misa Hayase won the first Animage Grand Prix Award for "Best Female Character" in Japanese anime.

Fictional character background
According to the fictional Macross continuity, Misa Hayase is of Japanese ethnicity. She was born into a Japanese family with a hundred-year military lineage and was the only daughter of Admiral Takashi Hayase. Misa also had aspired to enter the military since childhood. This dream was bolstered by a desire to join her boyfriend and first love, Riber Fruhling, in the UN Spacy. However, this dream ended when Riber died during the destruction of the returning U.N. Spacy fleet from the Salla Mars Base (where he was stationed) by hostile Anti-U.N. terrorist forces (with a stolen U.N. Spacy space cruiser).

After graduating first in her class at the UN Spacy Officers' Academy, she earned a bridge post aboard the SDF-1 Macross. Her rank was First Lieutenant at the beginning of the series. She and fellow SDF-1 bridge officer Claudia LaSalle became close friends. As Misa herself admits, her mind is constantly preoccupied with duty. However, this mindset changed after she met the young pilot Hikaru Ichijyo, who at that time was in love with the soon-to-be superstar Lynn Minmay. The relationship between Misa and Hikaru slowly evolved throughout the series. In the beginning, Misa and Hikaru had a difficult superior-subordinate relationship, starting with Hikaru calling her "old woman" (obasan) when he saw her for the first time on his Valkyrie's screen, which, much to Misa's chagrin, resulted in his senpai Roy Focker having a good laugh. However, the intensity of their relationship gradually softened after going through a series of crises and intimate moments together: Hikaru rescued Misa from the Mars base before the base exploded (Episode 7: Bye Bye Mars); they had their first "mission kiss" while demonstrating "Protoculture" to the Zentradi people (Episode 11: First Contact) and later managed to escape together (Episode 12: Big Escape); they accidentally shared an evening together while trapped in the transformed Macross and revealed to each other their respective lovelorn stories (Episode 21: Micro Cosmo).

While they were still unsure of their own feelings, both felt deep loneliness after Misa departed Macross to Earth, trying to persuade the United Government to enter peace negotiations with the Zentradi troops. Clumsy at communicating his feelings, Hikaru sent Misa the message "Wish you return to Macross safely" using the Morse code (Episode 24: Goodbye, Girl).

At the end of the Space War I, Hikaru ventured into the ruined Alaska base on Earth and rescued the sole survivor Misa. After their reunion, Hikaru told Misa that even though they were probably the only survivors on earth, he was happy as long as the partner was Misa (Episode 27: Love Flows By).

After Space War I, the love triangle of Misa-Hikaru-Minmay underwent many turns and Misa was deeply hurt by Hikaru's lingering feeling for Lynn Minmay. However, Hikaru eventually realized that he could not live without Misa after the heartbroken Misa confessed her love for him while bidding farewell to him.

The two got married on October 10, 2011, and their first daughter Miku Ichijyo (一条 未来 Ichijō Miku) was born a year later.

In 2012, Misa and Hikaru were appointed as the Commander of the new SDF-2 Megaroad-01 ship and the Capitan of the ship's escorting Valkyrie group, inaugurating the space colonization chapter in the Macross history.

In 2016, Megaroad-01 lost contact with Earth and Misa, Hikaru, Miku and the ship's crew and citizens (including Lynn Minmay, who remained as their friend and also boarded the ship) were declared missing.

In the world of Macross Delta, signals were received from the long lost Megaroad-01. A mysterious "Lady M" (レディM Redi Emu) from Megaroad-01, whose identity was never revealed in the TV series, loomed large behind the scenes. What is known that this mysterious figure had been sponsoring researches on songs/Protoculture since Space War I, and eventually created the ultimate songtress Mikumo Guynemer. Given the grand vision, political influence, and competence of Lady M in dealing with the New United Government and initiating the researches, the most likely candidate is Misa, the Commander of Megaroad-01 and the one who deciphered the lyrics of the song "Do You Remember Love."

Production
The character was written by Macross creator Shōji Kawamori, based on an innovative character concept he came up with. She was conceived as one of the main commanders of the Macross battleship. She was the boss and commanding officer of the fighter pilot protagonist Hikaru Ichijyo (called Rick Hunter in Robotech), and later his love interest. This was a scenario Kawamori came up with which he had not seen in any Hollywood movies before. A similar scenario, however, later appeared in the Hollywood movie Top Gun (1986). According to Kawamori, "Many people pointed out that later films like Top Gun copied that idea and setting, as well as including the combination of many songs and fighters too."

According to an article in Animerica magazine, Shoji Kawamori's original idea for the Macross series was an all-female crew for the battleship with a female captain at the helm. After the idea was revamped for its final presentation, the female captain idea was reworked and became the template for Misa's character.

In the American re-working of the series that became known as Robotech her name was changed to Lisa Hayes and her ethnicity was changed to a Caucasian American.

Additional notes on the character

Misa's character is the total opposite of the sweet, flighty, insecure Minmay. She's a strong-willed, determined and down-to-earth type of woman, completely immersed in doing her duty; at the same time, these traits had made her unable to maintain romantic relationships, although, as seen in the series, she lets her feelings interfere with her work.

Misa's best friend is officer Claudia LaSalle, who knows Misa from their days at the military academy. She is her confidante and advisor in her personal life.

While the Macross-related film The Super Dimension Fortress Macross: Do You Remember Love? tells a different take of events from the original series, Misa's character and relationship with Hikaru is portrayed in similar fashion as in the original.

Legacy
Catherine Glass of Macross Frontier physically resembles Misa Hayase, and is also shown to have trouble keeping up with a decent love life. Unlike Misa, Catherine and her love interest are supporting characters, rather than leading characters.

Sheryl Nome from Macross Frontier  also resembles Misa Hayase. Both of them are strong willed and down to earth women. In the manga adaptation of the series, there is a small tribute that has her wearing Misa's clothes (to match Ranka who wears Minmay's and Alto who is dressing as Hikaru).

References

External links
Official Macross website
Misa Hayase at the *Macross Compendium
Events in the year 1997 in the Macross chronology at the *Macross Compendium
Events in the year 2010 in the Macross chronology at the *Macross Compendium
Macross Nexus

Female characters in anime and manga
Television characters introduced in 1982
Fictional Japanese people in anime and manga
Fictional female majors
Hayase, Misa